Anthony Morris "Tony" Brooks   (4 April 1922 – 19 April 2007), code name Alphonse, was an agent for the United Kingdom's clandestine Special Operations Executive (SOE) organization in France during World War II.  The purpose of SOE was to conduct espionage, sabotage, and reconnaissance in countries occupied by Nazi Germany and other Axis powers. SOE agents allied themselves with French Resistance groups and supplied them with weapons and equipment parachuted in from England. Brooks received the Distinguished Service Order, Military Cross, Croix de guerre, and Légion d'honneur for his work as a leader of SOE's Pimento network sabotaging German reinforcements prior to and during the Normandy invasion. He later worked for the Foreign Office, and MI5 and MI6.

Of the more than 400 SOE agents who worked in France during World War II, M.R.D. Foot, the official historian of the SOE, named Brooks as one of the half-dozen best male agents.  Brooks is often characterized as the youngest SOE agent in France, but Sonya Butt was younger than he by several months when she arrived in France. In terms of length of time in France, however, Brooks was one of the longest serving SOE agents. He avoided capture by the Germans through strict adherence to security measures and survived the war.

Parents and education
Brooks was born at Orsett, Essex. His father, Douglas, was a businessman who had been involved in intelligence work in the First World War. His parents separated when he was young, and his mother, Beryl, died when he was a teenager. He was educated at Chillon College on Lake Geneva and Felsted in Essex. He spent much of his youth with relatives in France and Switzerland.

The escape line and escaping
When World War II began on 1 September 1939, Brooks, 17 years old, was visiting his uncle Norman Brooks' estate near Poligny, Jura in France. He applied to the British Embassy in Paris to join the Royal Air Force, but was turned down as too young. Working at his uncle's factory he felt more at home with the working class and the servants than he did in the luxurious surroundings of his uncle's estate. In June 1940 Nazi Germany invaded France and quickly overran the country and Brooks and his relatives joined millions of French people fleeing the Germans. After the armistice they returned to Poligny and Brooks joined his aunt Ruth in assisting stranded British soldiers and airmen to escape from France, now occupied or under the influence of the Germans. Brooks and his aunt sheltered the soldiers and on occasion accompanied them to Marseilles where the Pat O'Leary Escape Line organized their escape by boat or foot to Spain and Gibraltar. 

In 1941, Brook's status in France become dangerous as he was likely to be imprisoned as a British subject. In May he fled his uncle's estate and journeyed to Marseilles where he briefly worked with Donald Caskie and the Pat O'Leary Line and led a group of escapees to Spain. The Spanish interned him at the Miranda de Ebro camp for several months. He was finally released through the efforts of British authorities and proceeded onward to England, arriving there on 12 October 1941.   

Brook's clandestine activities while still a teen-ager, his wartime experiences in France and Spain, his affinity with the working classes, and his impeccable French, enabling him to pass easily as a Frenchman, served him well in his later work with the SOE.

SOE service
Brooks was rejected by MI9 and the Secret Intelligence Service as "too young", but was recruited by the Special Operations Executive. He was commissioned as a second lieutenant on the General List (without Army pay and allowances) on 9 April 1942.

After training, he parachuted back into France without a gun in July 1942, landing at St Léonard-de-Noblat, near Limoges.
 
After recuperating from injuries sustained in a heavy landing, he was involved in setting up the "Pimento" circuit of F Section, based in Toulouse and Lyon. His own codename was "Alphonse". He worked with railway workers in southern France, and he was able to slow the 2nd SS Panzer Division Das Reich under Heinz Lammerding from reaching the front after D-Day by derailing every train that left Marseille for Lyon at least once.

Brooks was both the youngest and longest-surviving F Section organizer of the Special Operations Executive. (Sonya Butt was younger, but she was not an "organiser" (leader of a circuit, but a courier.) He was arrested once, in July 1944, and interrogated at Montluc Prison, but his cover story was sufficiently convincing that he was released. He ended the war as a Major, and was awarded the Distinguished Service Order, Military Cross, Croix de Guerre and Légion d'honneur for his service.

After the war
He worked for the Foreign Office after the end of the war, spending time in the British embassy in Paris. He joined the Secret Intelligence Service (MI6), serving in Sofia from 1947 to 1950, but refused a posting to Hanoi in 1952 and resigned. After spending time in France, he rejoined MI6 in 1956, and was sent to Suez. He also undertook counter-terrorist operations in Cyprus. He was later British Consul General in Geneva, working again with MI6 in Cold War counter-espionage. He later joined the Security Service (MI5) before retiring in 1977.

Personal life
Brooks married twice, but had no children.

He died of stomach cancer in London, aged 85.

References

External sources

1922 births
2007 deaths
British Army General List officers
British Special Operations Executive personnel
British Army personnel of World War II
Companions of the Distinguished Service Order
Recipients of the Military Cross
Recipients of the Croix de Guerre 1939–1945 (France)
Recipients of the Legion of Honour
People educated at Felsted School
People from Orsett
Deaths from stomach cancer
Deaths from cancer in England
British intelligence operatives
World War II spies for the United Kingdom